Las Bela was a princely state in a subsidiary alliance with British India (later a princely state of Pakistan) which existed until 1955. Las Bela was bordered by the princely states of Kalat and Makran to the north and west. To the east lay the province of Sind and to the southeast lay the Federal Capital Territory around the city of Karachi.

History

The State of Las Bela was founded in 1742 by Jam Ali Khan I. His descendants ruled Las Bela until 1955 when the state became part of West Pakistan. The statement of Ghulam Qadir Khan the last Jam of Las Bela on signing the accession was:

 
For a period of three years between 3 October 1952 and 14 October 1955, Las Bela was part of the Baluchistan States Union but retained internal autonomy. In 1955, Las Bela was incorporated into the new province of West Pakistan and became part of Kalat division. In 1960, the area of Las Bela was detached from Kalat division and merged with the former Federal Capital Territory to form the division of Karachi-Bela. When the provincial system was changed in 1970, Las Bela became part of the new province of Balochistan.

Demographics
The main ethnic groups in Las Bela were Baloch. The population was mainly Muslim Balochs but there was a small population of Hindus.  There were also nomadic Lasi people near the Sindh border.

Geography and climate
Las Bela has a hot, dry tropical desert climate. It is only a few degrees north of the Tropic of Cancer. The sea breezes though make the weather less extreme than inland Balochistan, where temperatures can reach  in the summer.

Rulers
The hereditary rulers of Las Bela were styled as Jam Sahib. The Samma Dynasty took the title of Jam, the local equivalent of "King" or "Sultan".

Prominent members of the family after the end of the princely state included:

 Jam Ghulam Qadir Khan former Chief Minister of Balochistan province.
 Jam Mohammad Yousaf former Chief Minister of Balochistan province.
 Jam Ali Akbar former Provincial Minister of Balochistan province.
 Jam Kamal Khan Former chief minister of Balochistan and speaker of provincial assembley of Balochistan.

See also
Jam of Lasbela
Lasbela District
Kharan
Baluchistan (Chief Commissioner's Province)
Makran
Khanate of Kalat
Baluchistan States Union
Balochistan Province
List of Indian Princely States

References

External links
The Government of Balochistan

Balochistan
Princely states of Pakistan
Princely states of India
Muslim princely states of India

Lasbela District
1742 establishments in India
1955 disestablishments in Pakistan